Mathi is a comune (municipality) in the Metropolitan City of Turin in the Italian region Piedmont, located about  northwest of Turin.

Mathi borders the following municipalities: Corio, Balangero, Grosso, Cafasse, and Villanova Canavese.

Twin towns
 Las Parejas, Argentina
 Mġarr, Malta

References

External links
 Official website

Cities and towns in Piedmont